Pak Pak Pakaak is a 2005 Indian Marathi-language children's adventure comedy-drama film directed by Gautam Joglekar and produced by  Aashish Rego under the banner of SOC Films.

Synopsis 
A young mischievous boy Chikhluoo/Chiklu (Shaksham) goes to a big forest which is haunted by a demon called Bhutya (Nana). Through many encounters, Chiklu befriends a ghost and their lives change forever.

Cast 

 Saksham Kulkarni  as Chikhloo 
 Nana Patekar as Bhutya/Sakharam Vaidya 
 Narayani Shastri as Saloo
 Jyoti Subhash as grandmother of Chikhloo
 Nandu Pol as village chief
 Vijay Patwardhan as teacher 
 Usha Nadkarni as Gaurakha 
 Vidhyadhar Joshi as Exorcist 
 Jyoti Joshi as Shanta
 Aaditi Deshpande as Amba 
 Prachi Shah as Bhutya/Sakharam's wife
 Rekha Kamat as Tribal old woman

Soundtrack 
Songs:

Title track - by Ravindra Sathe, Vinod Rathod, and Yash Narvekar
Bhutyachye Naman - Sudesh Bhonsale
Kashaa Paai - Nana Patekar, Ravindra Sathe
Naanachi Taang - Nana Patekar, Yash Narvekar, K.C.Roy
Aaji Mhanati - Shreya Ghoshal
Tujh Lageen Saalu - Vaishali Samant, Yash Narvekar

Lyrics:

K. C. Roy, Shrirang Godbole, Jeetendra Joshi

References

External links  
 
Pak Pak Pakaak at Rotten Tomatoes

Indian adventure films
2005 films
2000s Marathi-language films